Wuhan Three Towns Football Club is a professional football club that currently participates in the Chinese Super League under licence from the Chinese Football Association (CFA). The club is based in Wuhan, Hubei and their home stadium is the Wuhan Sports Center with a seating capacity of 54,000.

History
The club was established as Wuhan Shangwen (Simplified Chinese: 武汉尚文) in 2013 by the Wuhan Football Association and private investment from the Wuhan Benhui Group, to mainly focus on the development of youth players. In 2018, the club started to participate in Wuhan Super League, and finished second right behind Wuhan Chufeng Heli. They also participated in 2018 Chinese Champions League, and making it to the final round of 16 before being eliminated by Nanjing Shaye. Ranking 11th, the club were later admitted into 2019 China League Two to fill the gap left by withdrawn team, right after changing their name to Wuhan Three Towns F.C. in January 2019.

Albert Garcia Xicota would be appointed Head coach of the club for the 2019 China League Two season and finished eleventh at the end of the season. The following campaign with the club he would go on to guide them in winning the division title and promotion into the second tier. In July 2021, Pedro Morilla was appointed as caretaker manager of the club, he had previously worked as techniques director. In December 2021, he was promoted to manager for winning 14 matches in a row. This achievement would see Wuhan going on to win the 2021 China League One division and promotion to the top tier.

On 31 December 2022, Wuhan Three Towns won the Chinese Super League for the first time after several fixtures were cancelled due to a national COVID-19 outbreak. They were awarded a 3–0 win against Tianjin Teda F.C., who had forfeited due to sick players, and had a better goal difference than Shandong Taishan to top the table.

Name history
2013–2018 Wuhan Shangwen F.C. 武汉尚文
2019–present Wuhan Three Towns F.C. 武汉三镇

Current squad

First team

Reserve squad

Out on loan

Coaching staff

Managerial history
  Zeng Qinggao (2018)
  Albert Garcia Xicota (2019–2021)
  Pedro Morilla (2021) (caretaker)
  Pedro Morilla (2021–)

Honours
Chinese Super League: 2022

China League One: 2021

China League Two: 2020

Results
All-time league rankings

As of the end of 2022 season.

 In group stage.

Key
<div>

 Pld = Played
 W = Games won
 D = Games drawn
 L = Games lost
 F = Goals for
 A = Goals against
 Pts = Points
 Pos = Final position

 DNQ = Did not qualify
 DNE = Did not enter
 NH = Not Held
 WD = Withdrawal
 – = Does Not Exist
 R1 = Round 1
 R2 = Round 2
 R3 = Round 3
 R4 = Round 4

 F = Final
 SF = Semi-finals
 QF = Quarter-finals
 R16 = Round of 16
 Group = Group stage
 GS2 = Second Group stage
 QR1 = First Qualifying Round
 QR2 = Second Qualifying Round
 QR3 = Third Qualifying Round

Affiliated clubs
  Shonan Bellmare (2022–present)

References

External links
 Official website 

Wuhan Three Towns F.C.
Football clubs in China
Association football clubs established in 2013
Sport in Wuhan
2013 establishments in China